Austrolittorina is a genus of sea snails, marine gastropod mollusks in the family Littorinidae, the winkles or periwinkles.

Species
Species within the genus Austrolittorina include:

 Austrolittorina antipodum (Philippi, 1847)
 Austrolittorina araucana (d'Orbigny, 1840)
 Austrolittorina cincta (Quoy & Gaimard, 1833)
 Austrolittorina fernandezensis (Rosewater, 1970)
 Austrolittorina unifasciata (Gray, 1826)

References

 Reid, D.G. & Williams, S.T. (2004) The subfamily Littorininae (Gastropoda: Littorinidae) in the temperate Southern Hemisphere: the genera Nodilittorina, Austrolittorina and Afrolittorina. Records of the Australian Museum 56: 75-122

External links

Littorinidae